Vinberg is  a locality and a parish in Falkenberg Municipality, Halland County, Sweden.

Vinberg may also refer to:

Vinberg (surname)
Vinberg Nature Reserve